David Bentley (born 1984) is an English footballer.

David Bentley may also refer to:
David Bentley (bishop of Barbados) (1882–1970), Anglican bishop
David Bentley (bishop of Gloucester) (1935–2020), Anglican bishop
David Bentley (businessman), Canadian businessman and media entrepreneur
David Bentley (journalist), Australian journalist and musician
David Bentley (footballer, born 1950), English footballer

See also
David Bentley Hart (born 1965), Eastern Orthodox theologian